Jacques Auguste Marie Le Clerc, marquis de Juigné (16 February 1874 – 12 February 1951) was a French politician.

Early life
Le Clerc de Juigné was born on 16 February 1874 in Paris, France.

Career
He served as the Mayor of Juigné-sur-Sarthe from 1900 to 1944.

He served as a member of the Chamber of Deputies from 1906 to 1936. He then served in the Senate from 1936 to 1941.

Personal life
He married Marie Madeleine Schneider, the daughter of Henri Schneider. They resided at the Château de Juigné. He also inherited the Château du Bois-Rouaud in Chéméré, Loire-Atlantique, from his uncle.

Death
He died on 12 February 1951.

References

1874 births
1951 deaths
Politicians from Paris
French monarchists
Members of the 9th Chamber of Deputies of the French Third Republic
Members of the 10th Chamber of Deputies of the French Third Republic
Members of the 11th Chamber of Deputies of the French Third Republic
Members of the 12th Chamber of Deputies of the French Third Republic
Members of the 13th Chamber of Deputies of the French Third Republic
Members of the 14th Chamber of Deputies of the French Third Republic
Members of the 15th Chamber of Deputies of the French Third Republic
Members of the 16th Chamber of Deputies of the French Third Republic
French Senators of the Third Republic
Senators of Loire-Atlantique
Mayors of places in Pays de la Loire